Watts Bank is a   nature reserve  south of Lambourn in Berkshire. It is managed by the Berkshire, Buckinghamshire and Oxfordshire Wildlife Trust. It is designated a biological Site of Special Scientific Interest as White Shute.

Watts Bank is a small chalk grassland bank. It has had over 30 butterfly species recorded.

Fauna

The site has the following fauna:

Butterflies

Aricia agestis, brown argus
Callophrys rubi, green hairstreak 
Melanargia galathea, marbled white
Lycaena phlaeas, small copper

Flora

The site has the following flora:

Plants

Gentianella amarella
Dactylorhiza fuchsii
Primula veris
Succisa pratensis
Linum catharticum
Anthyllis vulneraria

References

Parks and open spaces in Berkshire
Nature reserves in Berkshire
Berkshire, Buckinghamshire and Oxfordshire Wildlife Trust
Lambourn
Sites of Special Scientific Interest in Berkshire